The 70th district of the Texas House of Representatives contains parts of southern Collin County. The current Representative is Mihaela Plesa, who was elected in 2022.

References 

70